The Cynipoidea are a moderate-sized hymenopteran superfamily that presently includes five modern families and three extinct families, though others have been recognized in the past. The most familiar members of the group are phytophagous, especially as gall-formers, though the actual majority of included species are parasitoids or hyperparasitoids. They are typically glossy, dark, smooth wasps with somewhat compressed bodies and somewhat reduced wing venation. It is common for various metasomal segments to be fused in various ways (often diagnostic for families or subfamilies), and the petiole is very short, when present.

With the exception of the Cynipidae (the gall wasps), it is a poorly known group as a whole, though there are nearly 3000 known species in total, and a great many species are still undescribed, mostly in the Figitidae. Each of the constituent families differs in biology, though life histories of one of the families (Liopteridae) are still largely unknown. In July 2020 an identification key for the superfamily was published in the journal Insect Systematics and Diversity, enabling identification to the family level.

References

 
Apocrita superfamilies
Hymenoptera superfamilies